Bathytoma carnicolor is a species of sea snail, a marine gastropod mollusk in the family Borsoniidae.

Distribution
This marine species occurs in the Southwestern Pacific off the Solomon Islands, Vanuatu and Papua New Guinea.

Description
The height of this marine species attains 60 mm.

References

 Puillandre N., Sysoev A.V., Olivera B.M., Couloux A. & Bouchet P. (2010) Loss of planktotrophy and speciation: geographical fragmentation in the deep-water gastropod genus Bathytoma (Gastropoda, Conoidea) in the western Pacific. Systematics and Biodiversity 8(3): 371-394

External links
 
 MNHN, Paris: Bathytoma carnicolor

carnicolor
Gastropods described in 2010